Meksiko may refer to:
Novi Dol, formerly known as Meksiko, a hamlet in Dol pri Hrastniku,  Municipality of Hrastnik, Slovenia
"Meksiko", a song on the 1983 album Bez naglih skokova
Meksiko - ratni dnevnik, a 2000 book by Serbian novelist Vladimir Arsenijević

See also
Mexico, a country in North America
Mexico City, capital of Mexico